Travassosinematidae is a family of nematodes belonging to the order Rhabditida.

Genera

Genera:
 Binema Travassos, 1925
 Chitwoodiella Basir, 1948
 Isobinema Rao, 1958

References

Nematodes